Events from 1992 in Catalonia.

Incumbents

 President of the Generalitat of Catalonia – Jordi Pujol

Events
 15 March – Catalan parliamentary election. CiU win 70 seats, and Jordi Pujol is reelected President of the Generalitat.
 25 July – The 1992 Summer Olympics open in Barcelona.

References